Evarcha praeclara is a species of jumping spider in the genus Evarcha that lives in Sudan, Israel, Yemen, United Arab Emirates and Iran. The species was first described in 2003 by Jerzy Prószyński and Wanda Wesołowska but had been previously misclassified in the Mogrus and Pellenes genera.

References

Salticidae
Spiders of Asia
Spiders described in 2003
Taxa named by Wanda Wesołowska